Éternoz is a commune in the Doubs department in the Bourgogne-Franche-Comté region in eastern France.

Geography
Eternoz is 26 kilometres from Besancon, the department capital.
The River Vau passes through the village and plunges down a 40 meter waterfall on the edge of the village before joining the river Lison.

Notable buildings
The parish church, dedicated to Saint Laurent, was built in 1804. It has a single nave and belltower, with a round dome that is unusual in the region.

The chateau of Refranche was built in the 16th century by a branch of the Eternoz family. Until recently, only part of the main building and a tower remained, but it has recently been renovated.

For three generations, the Société Garnier had its workshop in Eternoz. In 1913, a local blacksmith, Jean Garnier, founded a forge that made and sold ploughs. By 1953, the business had sold 5000 ploughs, but this progressively gave way to the sale of more innovative and diverse farm machinery from the 1960s onwards. The resulting expansion led to the decision, in 2008, to move the company to new and larger premises 15 km away in Levier.

Notable people
 Alfred Billot (1925-1965), Catholic priest, missionary in Cameroon.
 Marie-Léone Bordy (1921-1992), nun of the congregation of the Filles de Notre-Dame du Sacré-cœur in Issoudun, assassinated in Djoum, Cameroun.
 Auguste Castan, librarian, historian, archaeologist; excavated Roman remains in Besançon on the site of which a square is named in his honour.
 Édouard Clerc, historian.
 Georges Colomb (1856-1945), botanist, science populariser, pioneer of comics.
 Alphonse Delacroix (1807-1878), architect.
 Pierre-Michel Duffieux (1891-1976), physicist and founded of Fourier Optics. Lecturer and researcher at the University of Franche-Comté. Lived at Coulans-sur-Lison.
 Emmanuelle Garnier (1964 - ), professor and currently president of the University of Toulouse-Jean Jaurès, originally from Doulaize.
 Pierre Lorius (1925-2014), professional footballer (goalkeeper). Played with Racing Besançon (1952-1954) FC Sochaux (1949-1952) and Lyon OU (1945-1947).
 Jean Mennerat (1917-2007), member of the French resistance, lived in Coulans-sur-Lison. Owned the world's largest collection of books about chess (27,500 volumes) which he bequeathed to the city of Belfort.
 Jules Quicherat (1814-1882), historian, archaeologist, professor at the École nationale des chartes.

Etymology
The name of the village has evolved over time. It has been called Esternoz (1262), Esternos (1275), Esternoch (1280), Esternoz dessoz Monmaour (1294), and Sternol (14th century). The name appears to be of Germanic origin, and may mean "valley of beech trees".

Demographics
Since 1973, the commune has been made up of five hamlets:
 Éternoz (191 inhabitants): round-domed church tower; two fountains.
 Refranche (42 inhabitants): bronze and iron age tumuli; chateau.
 Alaise (38 inhabitants): iron age tumuli; Roman remains; 14th century church.
 Doulaize (19 inhabitants): Paleolithic remains.
 Coulans-sur-Lizon (12 inhabitants): Church with a flamboyant Gothic porch.

Politics and administration

List of mayors

See also
 Communes of the Doubs department

References

Communes of Doubs